The ASUS V70 is a cellular phone from Asustek that was released in late 2005. The V70 is the first sliding phone ASUStek had released. It is a sliding phone (in the style of competing Samsung and LG phones), where the numeric keys are hidden beneath the screen of the phone when closed.

Design and Appearance
The V70 uses a slider form factor, where the user can push on a plastic bar located under the screen in order to open the sliding top portion of the phone.  When opened, the top portion slides upwards, revealing the standard bell keypad (including numeric, star, and pound keys).  These keys are covered when the phone is closed, but the remaining keys, including the side keys, can be used normally once the keypad is unlocked; such keys are automatically locked after the device is closed to prevent accidental activation when in a purse or pocket.

The V70 is available in black and white.

Technical specifications

 Caller ID	
 Photo Caller ID
 Video: Playback, Capture
 Bands: GSM 900/1800/1900
 Music Player: MP3 files
 Calculator and Currency Converter: Yes
 Calendar: Yes
 Talk Time: Up to 5 hours
 Standby Time: Up to 300 hours
 Dimensions (H x W x D): 90 x 45 x 24mm
Volume: 97 cubic centimetres
 Camera: 1.3 MP camera
 Removable Memory: MiniSD
 Speakerphone: Yes
 Weight: 85 g

Availability
The ASUS V70 is currently only available in Taiwan.

References

V70